At least two warships of Japan have been named Harushio:

, an  launched in 1967 and struck in 1984.
, a  launched in 1989 and struck in 2009.

Japanese Navy ship names
Japan Maritime Self-Defense Force ship names